This is a List of F-100 Units of the United States Air Force by wing, squadron, location, tailcode, features, variant, and service dates.  During the 1960s, squadrons were transferred regularly to different wings and bases temporarily, and sometimes permanently. In 1972, the Air Force eliminated the tailcode.

Active Duty

Air National Guard

In 1969, F-100Ds began transferring out Vietnam to state-side Air National Guard bases. By 1972, the Guardsmen had received 335 D models.

References

External links
 North American F-100 Super Sabre
 Tiscali's F-100 Wings and Squadrons (archive.org copy)

North American F-100 Super Sabre
F-100 Super Sabre (NA-180)
United States military aircraft
Military units and formations of the United States Air Force by equipment